Ballerup-Skovlunde Fodbold (BSF) is a women's football club from Ballerup. It is the female team of Ballerup-Skovlunde Fodbold. They play at Ballerup Idrætspark in Ballerup, Copenhagen, which has a capacity of 4,000. In 2010, the two neighbouring clubs Skovlunde IF and Ballerup IF merged into Ballerup-Skovlunde Fodbold (BSF). The women's team plays in the Danish top league Elitedivisionen. The club also has children's teams for boys and girls and a men's team in the fourth-tier Danmarksserien.

First-team squad 

 (captain)

References

External links
 Official site

Football clubs in Denmark
1956 establishments in Denmark
Women's football clubs in Denmark
Ballerup